Rosemary Hall may refer to:
Rosemary Hall (Greenwich, Connecticut), former campus of all-girls school, listed on the NRHP in Fairfield County, Connecticut
Rosemary Hall (North Augusta, South Carolina), listed on the NRHP in South Carolina

People
Rosemary Hall (political activist), 1925–2011, Scottish nationalist political organiser

See also
Choate Rosemary Hall, coed school in Wallingford, Connecticut that is successor to Greenwich all-girls school

Architectural disambiguation pages